The International Ornithological Committee (IOC) recognizes 239 species of woodpeckers which make up the family Picidae. They are distributed among 37 genera, seven of which have only one species. The family's taxonomy is unsettled; the Clements taxonomy lists 233 species and BirdLife International's Handbook of the Birds of the World lists 254.

This list is presented according to the IOC taxonomic sequence and can also be sorted alphabetically by common name and binomial.

References

W